Charles Banbury may refer to:

Charles William Banbury (1877–1914), Baron Banbury
Charles Banbury, 2nd Baron Banbury of Southam (1915–1981), Royal Warrant of Precedence
Charles William Banbury, 3rd Baron Banbury of Southam (born 1953)

See also
Banbury (disambiguation)